Chagatai (چغتای, Čaġatāy), also known as Turki, Eastern Turkic, or Chagatai Turkic (Čaġatāy türkīsi), is an extinct Turkic literary language that was once widely spoken across Central Asia and remained the shared literary language there until the early 20th century. It was used across a wide geographic area including parts of modern-day Uzbekistan, Xinjiang, Kazakhstan, and Kyrgyzstan. Literary Chagatai is the predecessor of the modern Karluk branch of Turkic languages, which include Uzbek and Uyghur. Turkmen, which is not within the Karluk branch but in the Oghuz branch of Turkic languages, was nonetheless heavily influenced by Chagatai for centuries. 

Ali-Shir Nava'i was the greatest representative of Chagatai literature.

Chagatai literature is still studied in modern Uzbekistan, where the language is seen as the predecessor and the direct ancestor of modern Uzbek, and the literature is regarded as part of the national heritage of Uzbekistan.

Etymology 
The word Chagatai relates to the Chagatai Khanate (1225–1680s), a descendant empire of the Mongol Empire left to Genghis Khan's second son, Chagatai Khan. Many of the Turkic peoples, 
who spoke this language claimed political descent from the Chagatai Khanate.

As part of the preparation for the 1924 establishment of the Soviet Republic of Uzbekistan, Chagatai was officially renamed "Old Uzbek", which Edward A. Allworth argued "badly distorted the literary history of the region" and was used to give authors such as Ali-Shir Nava'i an Uzbek identity. It was also referred to as "Turki" or "Sart" in Russian colonial sources. In China, it is sometimes called "ancient Uyghur".

History

Chagatai developed in the late 15th century. It belongs to the Karluk branch of the Turkic language family. It is descended from Middle Turkic, which served as a lingua franca in Central Asia, with a strong infusion of Arabic and Persian words and turns of phrase.

Mehmet Fuat Köprülü divides Chagatay into the following periods:
 Early Chagatay (13th–14th centuries)
 Pre-classical Chagatay (the first half of the 15th century)
 Classical Chagatay (the second half of the 15th century)
 Continuation of Classical Chagatay (16th century)
 Decline (17th–19th centuries)

The first period is a transitional phase characterized by the retention of archaic forms; the second phase began with the publication of Ali-Shir Nava'i's first divan and is the highpoint of Chagatai literature, followed by the third phase, which is characterized by two bifurcating developments. One is preservation of the classical Chagatai language of Nava'i, the other the increasing influence of dialects of the local spoken languages.

Influence on later Turkic languages
Uzbek and Uyghur two modern languages descended from Chagatai, are the closest to it. Uzbeks regard Chagatai as the origin of their language and Chagatai literature as part of their heritage. In 1921 in Uzbekistan, then a part of the Soviet Union, Chagatai was initially intended to be the national and governmental language of the Uzbek S.S.R.. However, when it became evident that the language was too archaic for that purpose, it was replaced by a new literary language based on a series of Uzbek dialects. 

Ethnologue records the use of the word "Chagatai" in Afghanistan to describe the "Tekke" dialect of Turkmen. Up to and including the eighteenth century, Chagatai was the main literary language in Turkmenistan and most of Central Asia. While it had some influence on Turkmen, the two languages belong to different branches of the Turkic language family.

Literature

15th and 16th centuries
The most famous of Chagatai poet, Ali-Shir Nava'i, among other works wrote Muhakamat al-Lughatayn, a detailed comparison of the Chagatai and Persian languages, in which he argued for the superiority of the former for literary purposes. His fame is attested by the fact that Chagatai is sometimes called "Nava'i's language". Among prose works, Timur's biography is written in Chagatai, as is the famous Baburnama (or Tuska Babure) of Babur, the Timurid founder of the Mughal Empire. A Divan attributed to Kamran Mirza is written in Persian and Chagatai, and one of Bairam Khan's Divans was written in Chagatai.

The following is a prime example of the 16th-century literary Chagatai Turkic, employed by Babur in one of his ruba'is.

I am become a desert wanderer for Islam,
Having joined battle with infidels and Hindus
I readied myself to become a martyr,
God be thanked I am become a ghazi.

Uzbek ruler Muhammad Shaybani Khan wrote a prose essay called "Risale-yi maarif-i Shayibani" in  Chagatai in 1507, shortly after his capture of Greater Khorasan, and dedicated it to his son, Muhammad Timur.   The manuscript of his philosophical and religious work, "Bahr ul-Khudo", written in 1508, is located in London

17th and 18th centuries
Important writings in Chagatai from the period between the 17th and 18th centuries include those of Abu al-Ghazi Bahadur: Shajara-i Tarākima (Genealogy of the Turkmens) and Shajara-i Turk (Genealogy of the Turks). In the second half of the 18th century, Turkmen poet Magtymguly Pyragy also introduced the use of the classical Chagatai into Turkmen literature as a literary language, incorporating many Turkmen linguistic features.

Bukharan ruler Subhan Quli Khan (1680-1702) was the author of a work on medicine "Subkhankuli's revival of medicine" ("Ihya at-tibb Subhani") which was written in the Central Asian Turkic language (Chaghatay) and is devoted to the description of diseases, their recognition and treatment. One of the manuscript lists is kept in the library in Budapest.

19th and 20th centuries
Prominent 19th-century Khivan writers include Shermuhammad Munis and his nephew Muhammad Riza Agahi. Muhammad Rahim Khan II of Khiva also wrote ghazals. Musa Sayrami's Tārīkh-i amniyya, completed in 1903, and its revised version Tārīkh-i ḥamīdi, completed in 1908, represent the best sources on the Dungan Revolt (1862–1877) in Xinjiang.

Dictionaries and grammars
The following are books written on the Chagatai language by natives and westerners:

 Vocabularium Linguae Giagataicae Sive Igureae (Lexico Ćiagataico)
 Muḥammad Mahdī Khān, Sanglakh.
 Abel Pavet de Courteille, Dictionnaire turk-oriental (1870).
 Ármin Vámbéry 1832–1913, Ćagataische Sprachstudien, enthaltend grammatikalischen Umriss, Chrestomathie, und Wörterbuch der ćagataischen Sprache; (1867).
 Sheykh Süleymān Efendi, Čagataj-Osmanisches Wörterbuch: Verkürzte und mit deutscher Übersetzung versehene Ausgabe (1902).
 Sheykh Süleymān Efendi, Lughat-ï chaghatay ve turkī-yi 'othmānī (Dictionary of Chagatai and Ottoman Turkish).
 Mirza Muhammad Mehdi Khan Astarabadi, Mabaniul Lughat: Yani Sarf o Nahv e Lughat e Chughatai.
 Abel Pavet de Courteille, Mirâdj-nâmeh : récit de l'ascension de Mahomet au ciel, composé a.h. 840 (1436/1437), texte turk-oriental, publié pour la première fois d'après le manuscript ouïgour de la Bibliothèque nationale et traduit en français, avec une préf. analytique et historique, des notes, et des extraits du Makhzeni Mir Haïder.

Orthography 
Chagatai has been a literary language and is written with a variation of the Perso-Arabic alphabet. This variation is known as Kona Yëziq,. It saw usage for Kazakh, Kyrgyz, Uyghur, and Uzbek.

Notes
The letters  ف، ع، ظ، ط، ض، ص، ژ، ذ، خ، ح، ث، ء  are only used in loanwords and don't represent any additional phonemes.

For Kazakh and Kyrgyz, letters in parenthesis indicate a modern borrowed pronunciation from Tatar and Russian that is not consistent with historic Kazakh and Kyrgyz treatments of these letters.

Influence
Many orthographies, particularly that of Turkic languages, are based on Kona Yëziq. Examples include the alphabets of South Azerbaijani, Qashqai, Chaharmahali, Khorasani, Uyghur, Äynu, and Khalaj. Virtually all other Turkic languages have a history of being written with an alphabet descended from Kona Yëziq, however, due to various writing reforms conducted by Turkey and the Soviet Union, many of these languages now are written in either the Latin script or the Cyrillic script.

The Qing dynasty commissioned dictionaries on the major languages of China which included Chagatai Turki, such as the Pentaglot Dictionary.

Punctuation 
Below are some punctuation marks associated with Chagatai.

Notes

References

Bibliography
Eckmann, János, Chagatay Manual. (Indiana University publications: Uralic and Altaic series ; 60). Bloomington, Ind.: Indiana University, 1966.
Bodrogligeti, András J. E., A Grammar of Chagatay. (Languages of the World: Materials ; 155). München: LINCOM Europa, 2001. (Repr. 2007), .
Pavet de Courteille, Abel, Dictionnaire Turk-Oriental: Destinée principalement à faciliter la lecture des ouvrages de Bâber, d'Aboul-Gâzi, de Mir Ali-Chir Nevâï, et d'autres ouvrages en langues touraniennes (Eastern Turkish Dictionary: Intended Primarily to Facilitate the Reading of the Works of Babur, Abu'l Ghazi, Mir ʿAli Shir Navaʾi, and Other Works in Turanian Languages). Paris, 1870. Reprinted edition, Amsterdam: Philo Press, 1972, . Also available online (Google Books)
 Erkinov, Aftandil. "Persian-Chaghatay Bilingualism in the Intellectual Circles of Central Asia during the 15th–18th Centuries (the case of poetical anthologies, bayāz)". International Journal of Central Asian Studies. C.H.Woo (ed.). vol.12, 2008, pp. 57–82 .
 Cakan, Varis (2011) "Chagatai Turkish and Its Effects on Central Asian Culture", 大阪大学世界言語研究センター論集. 6 pp. 143–158, Osaka University Knowledge Archive.

External links

Russian imperial policies in Central Asia 
Chagatai language at Encyclopædia Iranica
An introduction to Chaghatay by Eric Schluessel, Maize Books; University of Michigan Publishing 2018 (A self study, open access textbook with graded lessons)

Agglutinative languages
Vowel-harmony languages
Karluk languages
Nomadic groups in Eurasia
Timurid dynasty
Chagatai Khanate
Extinct languages of Asia
Languages attested from the 15th century
Languages extinct in the 20th century
Turkic languages
Lingua francas